The Botanischer Garten der Ruhr-Universität Bochum (13 hectares), also known as the Botanischer Garten Bochum, is a botanical garden maintained by the Ruhr University Bochum. It is located at Universitätsstraße 150, Bochum, North Rhine-Westphalia, Germany, and open daily without charge.

The garden was founded in 1968 and subsequently has been continuously expanded and improved. It opened to the public in 1971, with later developments as follows: tropical house, 1976; desert house, 1988; Chinese garden, 1990; savannah houses, 2000.

The garden's fenced, outdoors area (13,000 m2) cultivates plants organized into geobotanical regions, including forests, coasts, meadows, prairies, and marshes from the Americas, Asia, and Europe. It also contains an alpine garden and succulent garden.

Its Chinese garden (1000 m2) was created from 1986 to 1990, and renovated in 2001, by skilled gardeners donated by the Tongji University in Shanghai as a sign of friendship. It is named Qian Yuan (Qian Garden), reflecting a memory of poet Tao Qian (365-427 AD), and laid out in the southern Chinese style. A pond covers half its area.

The garden's greenhouses (total area 3,500 m2) contain collections of succulent Euphorbia (350 species), other succulents, Cycadaceae, Canary Island plants, Eriocaulaceae (5 species), and alpine plants. They are organized as follows:

 Tropical house (713 m2, 17 meter height) - tropical jungle vegetation and useful plants, with a small stream, herbs, banana trees, coffee bushes, etc.
 Desert house - dry tropical and subtropical plants from South America, Madagascar, and South Africa.
 Savannah houses - sclerophyllous shrubs from the savannahs of South Africa and Australia with accompanying vegetation. Collections include many eucalyptus species, as well as Australian grass trees (Xanthorrhoea) and an arborescent Cussonia.
 Alpine House (140 m2) - plants from high mountains

See also 

 List of botanical gardens in Germany

References 
 Botanischer Garten der Ruhr-Universität Bochum
 Plant list, with over 5300 photographs
 Hermann von Helmholtz-Zentrum entry
 BGCI entry
 Der chinesische Garten Qianyuan im Botanischen Garten der Ruhr-Universität Bochum  −  The Chinese Garden Qianyuan at Ruhr-University Bochum, Martin Woesler, Eberhard Koch, Johanna Franke, Yi Song, Arno Caspelherr, Stefanie Moser, Europäischer Universitätsverlag, Bochum, 2004. .

Bochum, Botanischer Garten der Ruhr-Universitat
Bochum, Botanischer Garten der Ruhr-Universitat
Ruhr University Bochum